The Lakulaku River, also called Lekuleku River or Lele River (樂樂溪), is a tributary of the Xiuguluan River in Taiwan. It flows through Hualien County for  before joining Xiuguluan River in Yuli, Hualien.

See also
List of rivers in Taiwan

References

Rivers of Taiwan
Landforms of Hualien County